Augustin Berjat (12 October 1869 – 11 July 1940) was a French sports shooter. He competed in the team clay pigeon event at the 1920 Summer Olympics.

References

External links
 

1869 births
1940 deaths
French male sport shooters
Olympic shooters of France
Shooters at the 1920 Summer Olympics
Place of birth missing